The DeCavalcante crime family, also known as the North Jersey Mafia, is an Italian-American Mafia organized crime family that operates mainly in northern New Jersey, particularly in Elizabeth, Newark, West New York, and various other North Jersey cities and the surrounding areas in North Jersey. It is part of the nationwide criminal network known as the American Mafia. It operates on the opposite side of the Hudson River from the Five Families of New York. It maintains strong relations with many of them, as well as with the Philadelphia crime family and the Patriarca crime family of New England. The Decavalcantes are considered by some to be the "Sixth Family".

Its illicit activities include bookmaking, cement and construction violations, bootlegging, corruption, drug trafficking, extortion, fencing, fraud, hijacking, illegal gambling, loan-sharking, money laundering, murder, pier thefts, pornography, prostitution, racketeering, and waste management violations.

History

Badami, Amari and Delmore
The Commission did not recognize the DeCavalcantes as an autonomous crime family until the regime of Sam DeCavalcante. There were several bosses in North Jersey during the Prohibition era controlling transportation of alcohol and whiskey into New York City, and there were two Mafia families based in New Jersey: the Newark family headed by Gaspare D'Amico, and the Elizabeth family headed by Stefano Badami. The New York City families had crews operating in New Jersey: the Masseria family's New Jersey faction, and the Reina family's Jersey crew. There was also Abner Zwillman, a Jewish gangster operating in Newark, and the Philadelphia crime family operating in South Jersey.

In 1935, Vincenzo Troia conspired to take over the Newark family and was murdered. D'Amico fled the United States in 1937 after a failed assassination attempt ordered by Joseph Profaci. The Commission decided to divide up his territory among the Five Families and Badami's Elizabeth family.

Stefano "Steve" Badami became the boss of the Elizabeth-Newark family. His reign proved to be very disruptive, as members of the Newark and the Elizabeth factions began fighting for total control of New Jersey. Badami kept controlling the crew up to the 1950s, but he was murdered in 1955 in what appears to have been another power struggle between the two factions. Badami's underboss Filippo Amari began to run the illegal operations. 

Amari was recognized by US law enforcement as being heavily involved with extortion, labor racketeering, loansharking, and narcotics activities in Newark and New York City. He was considered the new head of the New Jersey organization, but his reign proved to be very short, as there were multiple factions operating underneath who all conspired to take over. He relocated to Sicily and was replaced by Nicholas "Nick" Delmore. Delmore attended the infamous 1957 Apalachin Convention to represent the small New Jersey crime family, with underbosses of Elizabeth and Newark Frank Majuri and Louis "Fat Lou" LaRasso.

Delmore kept running the organization until he became ill in the early 1960s. He died in 1964, and his nephew Simone DeCavalcante was installed as new boss of the officially recognized "DeCavalcante crime family" of North Jersey.

Simone DeCavalcante
The official criminal organization began with Simone DeCavalcante, known as "Sam the Plumber" and "The Count". He was born in 1913 and was involved in illegal gambling, murder, and racketeering for most of his life. He died of a heart attack in 1997 at age 84. He rose to power in 1964, and he was incarcerated in 1969. He doubled the number of made men within his family during the 60s. 

He owned Kenilworth Heating and Air Conditioning in Kenilworth, New Jersey as a legal front and source of taxable income, for which he gained the nickname "Sam the Plumber". He also claimed to be of Italian royal lineage, earning him the nickname "The Count". He gained much respect because he held a place on the infamous Commission, a governing body for the American Mafia which included the Five Families of New York, the Chicago, LA and Florida.

DeCavalcante and 54 associates were charged and tried in 1969. He plead guilty to operating a gambling racket turning over $20 million a year. At the same time, a New York State report indicated that he and another Mafia family controlled 90-percent of the pornography stores in New York City. DeCavalcante was sentenced to five years in prison. He retired to a high-rise condo in Florida when he was released and largely stayed out of Mafia business, although the FBI believed that he was still advising the family into the early 1990s.

John Riggi
After DeCavalcante left prison in the mid-1970s, he appointed Giovanni "John the Eagle" Riggi as acting boss of the family while he stayed semi-retired in Florida. DeCavalcante stepped down as boss officially in 1980, passing leadership to Riggi, who had been a business agent of the International Association of Laborers and Hod Carriers in New Jersey for years. Riggi was promoted to the position of official boss, and he reaped the enormous benefits of large labor and construction racketeering, loansharking, illegal gambling, and extortion activities. Riggi also had the family maintain their old traditions, which Sam DeCavalcante saw as unnecessary.

Riggi used his power and influence to place subcontractors and workers at various construction projects around the state, and the DeCavalcantes were able to steal from union welfare and pension funds. Riggi continued to run the family throughout the 1980s, with underboss Girolamo "Jimmy" Palermo and Stefano Vitabile as consigliere, after Frank Majuri died of health problems. It was around the mid-1980s that Riggi fell increasingly under the influence of Gambino crime family boss John Gotti.

After Riggi's conviction for racketeering, he appointed John D'Amato as acting boss of the family in 1990. D'Amato was later revealed to have participated in homosexual acts and was murdered in 1992. Riggi continued to run the family from his jail cell, but he appointed Giacomo "Jake" Amari as his new acting boss. All was seemingly settled until Amari became ill and died slowly of stomach cancer in 1997. This caused a massive power vacuum within the family, with high-ranking members pushing to become the next boss of the DeCavalcante crime family.

The Ruling Panel
After acting boss Amari's death, Riggi organized a three-man ruling panel in 1998 to run the day-to-day business of the crime family, consisting of Girolamo Palermo, Vincent Palermo (no relation), and Charles Majuri, with Stefano Vitabile as the reputed consigliere and adviser to the three.

The Panel infuriated longtime captain Charles Majuri, who had been a hardworking member of the family since his teens and felt that he was wronged when he was not selected as the only acting boss. To gain complete control of the DeCavalcante family, Majuri decided that he should murder Vincent Palermo, leaving himself in charge of the family. Majuri contracted soldier James Gallo to murder Vincent Palermo. Gallo was a strong ally and friend of Vincent Palermo's, and told him about Majuri's plans. In retaliation, Vincent Palermo decided to have Majuri murdered. After one plot fell through, the murder was eventually called off.

Informants and convictions
Toward the late 1990s, the Ruling Panel kept running the DeCavalcante crime family with Giovanni Riggi still behind bars as the boss. The downfall of the DeCavalcante family was precipitated in 1998, when an associate named Ralph Guarino became an FBI informant, in an effort to avoid a long prison sentence in connection with taking part with two others in a heist of $1.6 million from the World Trade Center. Guarino spent ten years undercover working for the FBI. He wore a listening device and recorded conversations that mobsters would have about criminal business. During Guarino's time as an informant, fellow mobster Joseph Masella was gunned down on the orders of Vincent Palermo. 

Using information provided by Guarino, US law enforcement launched a large scale arrest on December 2, 1999 of over 30 members and associates of the DeCavalcante crime family. Palermo realized they would likely spend the rest of their lives behind bars and decided to cooperate with the FBI in exchange for a lenient sentence. This resulted in the arrest of 12 more men less than a year later, decimating the crime family's hierarchy and putting it on the brink of extinction. Other top members, like Anthony Rotondo and Anthony Capo, also agreed to become government witnesses.

In 2001, 20 mobsters were charged with racketeering, seven murders, 14 murder conspiracies, attempted murder, extortion in the construction industry, and stock fraud. This was the fourth indictment of the family since 1999. Since then, several other top mobsters agreed to become government witnesses in exchange for being given lenient or no sentences at all. US law enforcement even put Giovanni Riggi on trial, who was hoping to be released in 2003, and he was sentenced to 10 additional years in prison.

Current position and leadership
Between 1999-2005, about 45 men were imprisoned, including the family's consigliere and seven capos. With the decline of the DeCavalcante family, New York's Five Families have taken over many of the rackets in northern New Jersey. Riggi was in jail until November 27, 2012, and he died in 2015. Longtime acting boss Francesco Guarraci died of cancer in 2016.

In March 2015, the FBI arrested 10 members and associates of the crime family on charges of conspiracy to commit murder and distribution of drugs, including 71 year-old captain Charles "Beeps" Stango and 72 year-old consigliere Frank Nigro. Associates Rosario Pali and Nicholas DeGidio were convicted on April 4, 2017, after pleading guilty to distributing more than 500 grams of cocaine. DeGidio was sentenced to 1½ years in prison, and Pali was sentenced to over 6 years. Luigi Oliveri was charged with the possession of contraband cigarettes. 

In March 2017, Stango was sentenced to 10 years in federal prison for conspiracy to commit murder. Stango reportedly wanted Nigro and associate Paul Colella to get permission from the New Jersey hierarchy to kill Luigi Oliveri, but the murder was not committed because Stango did not get an answer. Prosecutors claimed that Stango and his son had plans to open a high-end escort service in Toms River, New Jersey.

In 2016, Anthony Stango Jr. was sentenced to 6 years in prison after pleading guilty to using a telephone in interstate commerce to conduct a prostitution operation, conspiring to distribute five grams or more of cocaine, distributing more than $70,000 worth of cocaine, and possessing a shotgun as a convicted felon. 

Longtime member Charles "Big Ears" Majuri is the current boss of the family.

In July 2022, capo Charlie Stango was released from federal prison and went into a New York halfway house.

Historical leadership

Boss (official and acting)
(excluding Gaspare D'Amico<ref>{{cite book|author=Critchley, David |title=The origin of organized crime in America: the New York City mafia, 1891-1931 |date=19 November 2008 |url=https://books.google.com/books?id=0_wq1QreSSoC&q=Gaspare+D%E2%80%99Amico&pg=PA290 |page=290|isbn=9780203889077 }}</ref>)

 1920s–1955 — Stefano Badami – murdered Elizabeth
 1955–1956 — Filippo "Phil" Amari – retired Elizabeth
 1956–1964 — Nicholas "Nick" Delmore Elizabeth
 Acting 1962–1964 — Sam DeCavalcante – became boss Elizabeth
 1964–1982 — Simone "Sam the Plumber" DeCavalcante – retired Elizabeth
 Acting 1970s–1982 — Giovanni "John the Eagle" Riggi – became boss Elizabeth
 1982–2015 — Giovanni "John the Eagle" Riggi – died of prostate cancer on August 3, 2015 Elizabeth
 Acting 1989–1990 — Gaetano "Corky" Vastola – imprisoned
 Acting 1990–1992 — John "Johnny Boy" D'Amato – murdered January 1992 Elizabeth
 Acting 1992–1997 — Giacomo "Jake" Amari – died of stomach cancer in 1997 Newark
 Ruling panel — 1997-1999 - Girolamo Palermo, Vincent Palermo and Charles Majuri – members arrested
 Ruling panel — 2000-2004 - Girolamo Palermo, Stefano Vitabile and Giuseppe "Pino" Schifilliti
 Acting 2005–2007 – Joseph "Joe the Old Man" Miranda – stepped down Elizabeth
 Acting 2007–2015 – Francesco "Frank" Guarraci – died on April 14, 2016 Elizabeth
 2016–present — Charles "Big Ears" Majuri Newark

Street boss
A "street boss" will sometimes run several crews at once.
2012–2015 — "Horse" — mentioned by Charles Stango in December 2012 wiretaps.
2015–2016 — "Milk" — mentioned by Charles Stango in December 2012 wiretaps.

Underboss (official and acting)
 1920s–1931 — Sam Monaco – murdered on September 10, 1931
 1931–1955 — Filippo "Phil" Amari – promoted to boss
 1955–1956 — Nicholas "Nick" Delmore – promoted to boss 
 1956–1957 — Francesco "Fat Frank" Majuri – stepped down and became consigliere Newark
 1957–1980s — Louis "Fat Lou" LaRasso – demoted, murdered in 1991 Elizabeth
 Acting 1970s – Giovanni "John the Eagle" Riggi – became acting boss
 Acting 1970s–1980s – Girolamo "Jimmy" Palermo – became official underboss
 1980s–2004 — Girolamo "Jimmy" PalermoActing 1991–1992 — Giacomo "Jake" Amari – became acting boss
 Acting 2003–2005 — Joseph "Joe the Old Man" Miranda – became acting boss
 2007–2014 — Joseph "Joe the Old Man" Miranda – died in 2014

Consigliere (official and acting)
 1920s–1957 — Unknown
 1957–1983 — Francesco "Fat Frank" Majuri – died in 1983 NewarkActing 1982–1983 — Stefano "Steve the Truck Driver" Vitabile – held most of the power, became official consigliere
 1983–2006 — Stefano "Steve the Truck Driver" Vitabile – sentenced to life in 2006, overturned in 2008, released in 2013Acting 2002–2003 — Frank D'Amato – arrested
 2006–present — Frank "Goombah Frankie" Nigro – arrested 2015

Current family members

Administration
 Boss – Charles "Big Ears" Majuri – is the son of former consigliere Frank Majuri. Upon Giacomo Amari's death, Giovanni Riggi appointed Majuri as one of the members of the Ruling Panel, along with Girolamo Palermo and Vincent Palermo. In 2000, Majuri was indicted on multiple charges including racketeering, loansharking, extortion, and conspiracy to commit murder. He was released from prison on April 28, 2009. Majuri's position in the family was confirmed in 2021.
 Underboss – Unknown 
 Consigliere – Frank "Goombah Frankie" Nigro – the current consigliere. On March 12, 2015, Nigro was indicted along with other members on charges of conspiracy to commit murder, drug trafficking and prostitution.

Caporegimes
Northern New Jersey Faction
Charles "Beeps" Stango – is a caporegime who was indicted with other members, including his son Anthony Stango, on March 12, 2015 on charges of conspiracy to commit murder, drug trafficking, and prostitution. On March 28, 2017, Stango was sentenced to 120 months after being convicted. In July 2022, Stango was released from federal prison and went into a New York halfway house.Acting – Unknown

New York City-New Jersey Faction
 Philip "Lou Metzer" Abramo – caporegime of the "New York City-New Jersey crew", operating in Wall Street, New Jersey and Florida. His brother-in-law Louis Consalvo has been a longtime member of his crew. Abramo was a former associate of John Gotti. In June 1999, Abramo, Philip Gurian, Glen Vittor, Louis Consalvo and Barry Gesser were charged with mail fraud, wire fraud, securities fraud, interference with commerce by extortion, conspiracy to commit money laundering and witness tampering. In 2004, Abramo pleaded mail fraud, wire fraud and securities fraud and received a 70-month jail sentence and forfeited $1.1 million previously seized by the government in the Bahamas. In 2006, Abramo was sentenced to life in prison for racketeering and the murders of Fred Weiss and John D'Amato. In 2008, the sentence was overturned and he was released in 2018.Acting – Louis "Louie Eggs" Consalvo – acting caporegime of Philip Abramo's "New York City-New Jersey crew". Consalvo is a longtime member of his brother-in-law Philip Abramo's crew. In June 1999, Consalvo along with Philip Abramo, Philip Gurian, Glen Vittor and Barry Gesser were charged with mail fraud, wire fraud, securities fraud, interference with commerce by extortion, conspiracy to commit money laundering and witness tampering. In 2004, Consalvo pleaded mail fraud, wire fraud and securities fraud and received a 27-month jail sentence. In 2000, Consalvo was indicted and charged with murdering former underboss Louis "Fat Lou" LaRasso in 1991 along with Gregory Rago. The indictment also charged Consalvo with selling 8,000 shares of stock in a company called SC&T International. In 2002, Consalvo accepted a plea agreement and was sentenced to 20 to 25 years in prison. In February 2012, he was released from prison.

Soldiers
 Giuseppe "Pino" Schifilliti – In 2003, he was indicted for racketeering, as well as the murders of Louis LaRasso and John D'Amato. In 2006, he was sentenced to life in prison, but that sentence was turned over in 2008.
Jerry Balzano - served 2 years after being convicted of racketeering conspiracy in 2011; other charges were selling untaxed cigarettes and the theft of a $15,000 tax refund check. His first release violation was the possession of a handgun and ammunition. While on supervised release in November 2016, he engaged in a road rage incident after another driver cut him off, assaulting and hurling verbal abuses at the other driver. He received 11 months in prison and 21 months of supervised release.

Frank D'Amato
 Anthony Mannarino
 Bernard NiCastro
 Gregory Rago
 Gaetano "Corky" Vastola – former caporegime.

Former members
Francesco "Frank" Guarraci  — died on April 14, 2016.
 Rudolph "Tootsie" Farone
James "Jimmy" Gallo
 Joseph "Joey O" Masella
Joseph "Joe Red" Merlo Jr. —  former made member and go between for Charles Majuri. His father Joe Merlo, Sr. was a soldier under DeCalvacante family boss John Riggi hailing from the family’s Elizabeth faction. He owned Joey’s Pizza on South Elmora Ave in Elizabeth. Merlo Jr. died June 3, 2021.
 Vincent "Jimmy the Gent" Rotondo
 Frank Polizzi
 Salvatore "Little Sal" Timpani

Government informants
 Ralph "Ralphie" Guarino - former associate of the family, Guarino was one of the masterminds behind the 1998 Bank of America robbery which took place at 1 World Trade Center. Guarino and WTC worker Salvatore Calciano planned the heist, employing three gunmen to carry it out: Richard Gillette, Melvin Folk and Mike Reed. All three were arrested shortly after the robbery, and Guarino was arrested by FBI agents on Staten Island. Guarino became an informant following his arrest.
 Vincent "Vinny Ocean" Palermo - former acting boss during the 1990s. He married the niece of Sam DeCavalcante during the early 1960s. He was inducted into the DeCavalcante family in 1989. As a favour for Gambino crime family boss John Gotti, DeCavalcante boss Giovanni Riggi "ordered a contract" on Fred Weiss (arranged for him to be murdered) on 11 September 1989. Palermo and Jimmy Gallo shot Weiss 7 times. Palermo allegedly orchestrated the October 1998 murder of his bodyguard and DeCavalcante associate Joseph Masella, who was found shot several times at a golf course in Marine Park, Brooklyn. In December 1999, he was arrested on murder, extortion, bookmaking, loansharking, illegal gambling, robbery, the sale of stolen property and counterfeit goods, and mail fraud charges, alongside 38 other mobsters from the DeCavalcante and New York crime families, including 2 DeCavalcante captain's, Joseph Giacobbe and Anthony Rotondo. He allegedly oversaw an illegal bookmaking operation with the New York Gambino and Colombo crime families. He agreed to become a government witness in 1999, several weeks after his arrest. In October 2000, Palermo pleaded guilty to 4 murders, 7 murder conspiracies, extortion, loansharking, gambling and obstruction of justice charges.
 Anthony "Tony" Capo - former soldier and hitman for the DeCavalcante crime family. He served as the driver during the murder of Fred Weiss on September 11, 1989. In late 1991, Capo received information that DeCavalcante acting boss John D'Amato was a closet homosexual. He testified in court that consigliere, Stefano Vitabile, ordered D'Amato's murder. D'Amato was lured to a parked car in Brooklyn and allegedly sat in the back of the car, Capo turned around from the passenger seat and shot him 4 times. During one incident in the mid-1990s, he stabbed Gambino associate Renee "Remy" Sierra in his face and eye, for disrespecting him in front of a female in a Staten Island bar. Another assault occurred in the late 1990s which consisted of him beating a parking lot attendant with a steel baton, a pipe and a baseball bat, after spraying him in the face with mace, as the attendant was accused of having a fistfight with DeCavalcante captain Rudy Ferrone. In 1999, he became a government witness. He pleaded guilty to 11 murder conspiracies, participating in 2 murders, several assaults and many other crimes. He also testified against the New York Colombo and Genovese mafia families. Capo died in 2012 at the age of 52 from a heart attack.
 Frank "Franky the Beast" Scarabino - former soldier. In late 1999, captain Giuseppe Schifilliti was tasked to kill Scarabino after Vincent Palermo suspected him of being an informer.
 Anthony Rotondo - former captain. His father, Vincent Rotondo, was also a DeCavalcante member and had ties to the Colombo and Bonanno crime families in New York, including to former Bonanno boss Rusty Rastelli. He was proposed for membership in 1978 by his father and it is believed that he was inducted in 1982 by Sam DeCavalcante. In 1988, his father was killed and shot 6 times. He became an informant in early 2003. In November 2004, he testified against high-ranking Gambino members, Thomas "Huck" Carbonaro and Peter Gotti. He admitted to participation in the murders of Fred Weiss in 1989, a DeCavalcante associate, captain and acting boss John D'Amato's execution in 1992.

In popular culture
The DeCavalcante crime family is partly the inspiration for the fictional DiMeo crime family of the HBO television series The Sopranos. The family was the subject of the CNBC program Mob Money, which aired on June 23, 2010, and The Real Sopranos TV documentary directed by Thomas Viner for the UK production company Class Films.

Notes

References

Deitche, Scott M. Garden State Gangland: The Rise of the Mob in New Jersey''. Lanham : Rowman & Littlefield, 2017

Further reading

Books

Court proceedings

News and reports

 
 
 
 

 
Organizations established in the 1900s
1990s establishments in New Jersey
Organizations based in Elizabeth, New Jersey
Organizations based in Newark, New Jersey
Italian-American crime families
Gangs in Connecticut
Gangs in Florida
Gangs in New Jersey
Italian-American culture in New Jersey
The Sopranos